is a Japanese manga series written and illustrated by Seiji Matsuyama. The story depicts the life of schoolboy Densuke Mifune after he is forced into the mysterious Eiken Club.

The manga series ran for eighteen volumes, and additionally included a series guidebook. A number of radio drama episodes and a two episode OVA (the latter roughly based on a volume 3 storyline) have also been produced.

The first twelve manga volumes have been released in North America. The first three volumes were rated 16+, while subsequent volumes were rated 18+.

Plot
Densuke has just enrolled at the exclusive Zashono Academy. He is very eager to participate in extracurricular activities, but never expected to join the mysterious Eiken Club. Strangely enough, every other member is a busty co-ed, and many of the club's activities involve bikinis. But Densuke is not interested in anyone except for the shy and beautiful Chiharu Shinonome.

Characters

The red-headed Chiharu is considered one of the most attractive girls at Zashono Academy. She is shy around boys, because she came from an all-girls school.

A plain boy no one seems to notice, Densuke was forced into the Eiken Club after an accidental run-in with Chiharu, whom he develops a crush on. He eventually accepts his place in the club, despite being tormented by Kirika and the other mishaps that befall him, i.e. being beaten, violently crushed (Kirika, Yuriko) or electrocuted (Kyoko) by other members. Densuke is frequently forced to cross-dress by Kirika, a hobby of hers.

Not much is known about Kirika, the purple-haired amazon that runs the Eiken Club. She likes putting Densuke in awkward situations for her amusement.

The pink-haired Komoe is the youngest member of the Eiken Club at 11 years old, who dialogues with macromastia. Komoe is very clumsy, but always striving to do her best. Her clumsy mistakes often leave her exposed, and she has a habit of accidentally hurting and squashing Densuke when falling on him.

Grace is a blonde-haired British girl who was born and grew up in China. She comes from a fortune-tellers' family and her father is a successful world-class enterpriser, also she is also very good at acrobatics. She seems to have a bit of feeling for Densuke as in the original manga, her words with Densuke in the speech bubbles are often ended with love-hearts. In the English version, her name was romanized as Lynn Grace.

Kyoko is the small blue-haired girl who runs the science division of the Eiken Club, and would seem to be the second-in-command of the club. Despite her age, she looks a lot younger than she really is. She often hurts Densuke with her various inventions (rockets, electrocuters). In the English version, her name was romanized as Kyouko Morooka.

Chiharu's energetic sister, she looks like a short-haired cheekier version of Chiharu. Despite being fully aware of Densuke and Chiharu's feelings for each other, Yuriko likes trying to get between them.

Sensei is never named, though she is a teacher from Zashono Academy, she often laments the fact she always seems to go unnoticed by her students and peers, not to mention the fact that they never seem to remember her name. She has bright green hair. In the English version, she was simply called the Teacher.

Teddy is a very shy young girl, who wears a giant bear suit most of the time. She has an older sister, who also wears a similar suit.

Chiharu's cousin, who also has a crush on Densuke. Her timetable always seems to be occupied by many part-time jobs. Densuke eventually finds out that she is secretly funding detectives who promised to find her long-lost father who left almost without a word after the divorce (due to the bankruptcy of his factory).

She is head of Zashono Academy's Committee of Student Accountants. She had mysteriously returned to the academy over a two year span with an immediate action of carrying out her own budget plan:to forcefully cancel all the activities of all the clubs in the academy, despite all the dirty tricks she has in mind.

The ex-head of the Supernatural Club in Zashono Academy, a slim and weedy girl whose body is dotted with bandages from the countless bruises and wounds caused by falling due to fainting resulted by her anemia.

The mother of the Shinonome family.

The younger brother of Chiharu. He first appears pretending to be Chiharu in order to test Densuke. He is practically Chiharu's twin, and it is hinted that he is interested in Densuke, whether that is true or not, is not known.

He is the champion of the previous academy tournament who has returned from America to win the heart of Chiharu Shinonome. He is aware of Densuke's feelings for her, and feels that competition is the only way to decide who should get the girl.

Reception
Eiken was panned by critics for being "obscene" and "lacking substance". Jason Thompson gave the manga a zero-star rating in his review of the series in his Manga: The Complete Guide, calling it "Actual pornography disguised as romantic comedy pseudo-pornography".

Stig Høgset gave the anime a one-star review on THEM Anime Reviews, calling it "one of the most exploitative, demeaning anime titles I have ever seen". He went on say that "Eiken is like an hour-long nightmare of sexual innuendo of the creepy kind... you'll never find a bigger collection of 'wrong' anywhere else."
 
In Mania.com's reviews, Chris Beveridge gave the anime an "F", while Eduardo M. Chavez gave the first manga volume a "D+".

Notes

References

External links
Eiken official website at J.C.Staff 

2001 manga
2003 anime OVAs
Akita Shoten manga
J.C.Staff
Media Blasters
Sex comedy anime and manga
Shōnen manga